The Maithili - Bhojpuri Academy, Delhi, is an autonomous organisation of the Government of Delhi dedicated to the promotion of Maithili and Bhojpuri languages, their literatures and cultures.

References

Government of Delhi
Language regulators